Stamford College may refer to:
 Stamford College, Lincolnshire further education college in Stamford, Lincolnshire 
 Stamford College, Texas (1907–1918) former college in Stamford, Texas
 Stamford College, Petaling Jaya, Malaysia
 Stamford International College in Thailand, originally founded by Stamford College, Malaysia

See also
Stamford University (disambiguation)